The 1962 New Hampshire Wildcats football team was an American football team that represented the University of New Hampshire as a member of the Yankee Conference during the 1962 NCAA College Division football season. In its 14th year under head coach Chief Boston, the team compiled a 7–0–1 record (4–0–1 against conference opponents), won the Yankee Conference championship, and outscored opponents by a total of 100 to 46. The team's only setback was a tie with Rhode Island. The team played its home games at Cowell Stadium in Durham, New Hampshire.

Schedule

References

New Hampshire
New Hampshire Wildcats football seasons
Yankee Conference football champion seasons
College football undefeated seasons
New Hampshire Wildcats football